The 1996 Turkmenistan Higher League (Ýokary Liga) season was the fifth season of Turkmenistan's professional football league. Eight teams competed in 1996. The championship was not completely finished and Nisa Ashkhabad was proclaimed champion.

Results

External links
 

Ýokary Liga seasons
Turk
Turk
1996 in Turkmenistani football